This is a list of mammal species recorded in Svalbard and Jan Mayen. There are seventeen mammal species in Svalbard and Jan Mayen, of which three are endangered and three are vulnerable.

The following tags are used to highlight each species' conservation status as assessed by the International Union for Conservation of Nature:

Order: Rodentia (rodents) 

Rodents make up the largest order of mammals, with over 40 percent of mammalian species. They have two incisors in the upper and lower jaw which grow continually and must be kept short by gnawing.
Suborder: Sciurognathi
Family: Cricetidae
Subfamily: Arvicolinae
Genus: Microtus
 Southern vole, Microtus levis LC introduced

Order: Cetacea (whales) 

The order Cetacea includes whales, dolphins and porpoises. They are the mammals most fully adapted to aquatic life with a spindle-shaped nearly hairless body, protected by a thick layer of blubber, and forelimbs and tail modified to provide propulsion underwater.

Suborder: Mysticeti
Family: Balaenidae (right whales)
Genus: Balaena
 Bowhead whale, Balaena mysticetus 
Genus: Eubalaena
 North Atlantic right whale, Eubalaena glacialis 
Family: Balaenopteridae (rorquals)
Subfamily: Balaenopterinae
Genus: Balaenoptera
 Minke whale, Balaenoptera acutorostrata 
 Blue whale, Balaenoptera musculus 
 Fin whale, Balaenoptera physalus 
Subfamily: Megapterinae
Genus: Megaptera
 Humpback whale, Megaptera novaeangliae 
Suborder: Odontoceti
Superfamily: Delphinoidea
Family: Delphinidae (marine dolphins)
 Genus: Lagenorhynchus
 White-beaked dolphin, Lagenorhynchus albirostris LC
 Genus: Leucopleurus
 Atlantic white-sided dolphin, Leucopleurus acutus LC
Genus: Orcinus
 Killer whale, Orcinus orca 
Family: Monodontidae (narwhal and beluga)
Genus: Monodon
 Narwhal, Monodon monoceros 
Genus: Delphinapterus
 Beluga, Delphinapterus leucas 
Family: Ziphiidae (beaked whales)
Subfamily: Hyperoodontinae
Genus: Hyperoodon
 Northern bottlenose whale, Hyperoodon ampullatus

Order: Carnivora (carnivorans) 

There are over 260 species of carnivorans, the majority of which feed primarily on meat. They have a characteristic skull shape and dentition. 
Suborder: Caniformia
Family: Canidae (dogs, foxes)
Genus: Vulpes
 Arctic fox, Vulpes lagopus 
Family: Ursidae (bears)
Genus: Ursus
 Polar bear, Ursus maritimus 
Family: Odobenidae
Genus: Odobenus
 Walrus, Odobenus rosmarus 
Family: Phocidae (earless seals)
Genus: Cystophora
 Hooded seal, Cystophora cristata 
Genus: Erignathus
 Bearded seal, Erignathus barbatus 
Genus: Pagophilus
 Harp seal, Pagophilus groenlandicus 
Genus: Phoca
 Harbor seal, Phoca vitulina 
Genus: Pusa
 Ringed seal, Pusa hispida

Order: Artiodactyla (even-toed ungulates) 

The even-toed ungulates are ungulates whose weight is borne about equally by the third and fourth toes, rather than mostly or entirely by the third as in perissodactyls. There are about 220 artiodactyl species, including many that are of great economic importance to humans.

Family: Bovidae (cattle, antelope, sheep, goats)
Subfamily: Caprinae
Genus: Ovibos
 Muskox, O. moschatus  introduced, extirpated
Family: Cervidae (deer)
Subfamily: Capreolinae
Genus: Rangifer
 Reindeer, R. tarandus 
Svalbard reindeer, R. t. platyrhynchus

See also
List of chordate orders
Lists of mammals by region
List of prehistoric mammals
Mammal classification
List of mammals described in the 2000s

Notes

References
 

 Aulagnier, S. et al. (2008) Guide des mammifères d'Europe, d'Afrique du Nord et de Moyen-Orient. Delachaux et Niestlé, Paris
 Shirihai, H. & Jarrett, B. (2006) Whales, Dolphins and Seals: A Field Guide to the Marine Mammals of the World. A & C Black, London

Mammals, Svalbard
Svalbard and Jan Mayen
Mammals
Fauna of Svalbard
Jan Mayen
Svalbard